"Sin Ti" is a Latin pop song by Venezuelan musical duo Chino & Nacho. It was released as the fourth single from their third studio album Supremo (2011) on December 13, 2012. The song was included in their EP Supremo: Reloaded.

Track listing 
Digital download
 "Sin Tí" -

Charts

References 

Chino & Nacho songs
Spanish-language songs
2012 singles
2013 singles
Machete Music singles
2011 songs